The spotted softshell turtle (Pelodiscus variegatus) is a species of turtle in the family Trionychidae. It is found in Indochina, where it is largely restricted to most of Vietnam; however, an isolated population is also known from Hainan Island, where it is the only Pelodiscus species. Aside from genetic differences, this species can be most readily distinguished from other Pelodiscus by the large blotches on its plastron, which also gave it its name. Due to its restricted geographic range and the heavy level of exploitation it receives, it has been proposed that this species be classified as Critically Endangered under the IUCN Red List.

References 

Pelodiscus
Turtles of Asia
Reptiles of China
Reptiles of Vietnam
Reptiles described in 2019